The Lira (previously, the National Music Awards) is a Belarusian set of national music awards in the field of popular music, which was founded on December 24, 2010, it was an initiative of the Ministry of Culture of the Republic of Belarus. Since 2011, the Lira has been broadcast by the Capital TV channel.

Origin 
On October 15, 2010, the chairman of the National State Television and Radio Company of Belarus, Alexander Zimovsky, announced that the Ministry of Culture of the Republic of Belarus had proposed the creation of the television contest “National Music Awards”. The awards were to be presented in the categories of “Best Song of the Year,” “Best Performer,” “Best Band,” “Opening of the Year,” and “For Contribution to the Development of Belarusian Pop Music.”

The Ministry of Culture also announced the prizes for the winners, "Best Song of the Year" would receive a cash prize of 95 basic units (US$1,111) and a certificate for creating a music video. Both, the performer and songwriters are awarded in the nomination. In other categories with interactive voting, there were awards equalling 77 basic units (BU). The winner for "Best Belarusian-language Song of the Year" received a cash prize of 73 basic units ($853), and other smaller prizes were also offered in other categories as well.

2011 Awards 

Songs written from December 2010 to November 2011 were accepted for consideration. The expert panel of judges included 100 people and the winners were all announced on December 13, 2011.

|-
! scope="row" | 2011
| music by Ŭladzimier Kandrusievič, lyrics by Voĺha Boldyrava, singing by Alyona Lanskaya
| Belarusian-language Song of the Year
| 
|-
! scope="row" | 2011
| Dmitry Koldun
| Song of the Year
| 
|-
! scope="row" | 2011
| Инна Афанасьева
| Best Singer - Female
| 
|-
! scope="row" | 2011
| Алексей Хлестов
| Best Singer - Male
| 
|-
! scope="row" | 2011
| Троица
| Best Group
| 
|-
! scope="row" | 2011
| Teo 
| Discovery of the Year
| 
|-
! scope="row" | 2011
| Леонид Ширин
| Best Songwriter
| 
|-
! scope="row" | 2011
| Нина Богданова
| Best Lyricist
| 
|-
! scope="row" | 2011
| Том первый(Анна Хитрик and band S°unduk)
| Album of the Year
| 
|-
! scope="row" | 2011
| Саша Немо
| Best Arrangement
| 
|-
! scope="row" | 2011
| The Sumer Amphitheatre in Vitebsk on May 4, 2011 (Yadviga Poplavskaya and Alexander Tikhanovich)
| Best Concert
| 
|-
! scope="row" | 2011
| J:Морс
| Best Tour
| 
|-
! scope="row" | 2011
| See You in Vegas (Litesound)
| Best Music Video
| 
|-
! scope="row" | 2011
| Oleg Klimov (Sovetskaya Belorussiya – Belarus' Segodnya)
| Best Journalist/Music Critic
| 
|-
! scope="row" | 2011
| Максим Олейников (band Топлес)
| Best Producer
| 
|-
! scope="row" | 2011
| Vladimir Mulyavin (VIA Pesniary) (posthumously)
| Contribution to the Development of Belarusian Pop Music
| 
|-
! scope="row" | 2011
| Lidiya Zablotskaya
| Star of the Year (Best Young Performer)
| 
|-
! scope="row" | 2011
| Вадим Галыгин
| Best Duo
| 
|-
! scope="row" | 2011
| (music by Олег Молчан, lyrics by Ирина Видова, singing by Ирина Видова)
| People's Choice Award
| 
|-
! scope="row" | 2011
| Михаил Финберг
| Development of the Traditional Belarusian Song
|

2012 Awards 

|-
! scope="row" | 2012
| 
| Belarusian-language Song of the Year
| 
|-
! scope="row" | 2012
| Лариса Грибалёва
| Song of the Year
| 
|-
! scope="row" | 2012
| Саша Немо
| Best Pop Group
| 
|-
! scope="row" | 2012
| Open Space
| Best Rock Group
| 
|-
! scope="row" | 2012
| Apple Tea
| Best Jazz Group
| 
|-
! scope="row" | 2012
| Stary Olsa
| Best Ethno-folk Group
| 
|-
! scope="row" | 2012
| Герман (song: В тишине рассвета)
| Best Songwriter
| 
|-
! scope="row" | 2012
| Ярослав Ракитин (song Слышишь, я иду к тебе)
| Best Lyricist
| 
|-
! scope="row" | 2012
| Мне с тобою повезло(Тяни-Толкай)
| Best Album
| 
|-
! scope="row" | 2012
| Yuriy Vashchuk
| Best Arranger
| 
|-
! scope="row" | 2012
| beZ bileta
| Concert of the Year
| 
|-
! scope="row" | 2012
| Alexander Solodukha
| Best Tour
| 
|-
! scope="row" | 2012
| Лермонт
| Music Video of the Year
| 
|-
! scope="row" | 2012
| Сергей Андрианов
| Best Journalist/Music Critic
| 
|-
! scope="row" | 2012
| Селитра № 7(Drum Ecstasy)
| Best Song for Film or Television
| 
|-
! scope="row" | 2012
| Владимир Кубышкин
| Best Producer
| 
|-
! scope="row" | 2012
| Яков Науменко (posthumously)
| For Contribution to the Development of Modern Music
| 
|-
! scope="row" | 2012
| Александра Локтионова
| Star of the Year (Best Young Performer)
| 
|-
! scope="row" | 2012
| Юлия Жидкая
| Debut of the Year
| 
|-
! scope="row" | 2012
| Alexander Solodukha and participants of the project Поющие города from Minsk
| Creativity of the Year
| 
|-
! scope="row" | 2012
| Alyona Lanskaya
| Hope of the Year
| 
|-
! scope="row" | 2012
| participants of the project Поющие города from Rahachow
| Understudies of the Year
|

2013 Awards 
In the period from November 1 to November 21, 2013, applications were collected for the third National Musical Awards. Songs that were released between November 1, 2012, and October 31, 2013 were eligible for the awards. The award show itself took place on December 16 at the Palace of the Republic.

|-
! scope="row" | 2013
| Танчыць (ili-ili)
| Belarusian-language Song of the Year
| 
|-
! scope="row" | 2013
| Падал первый снег (music by Евгений Олейник, lyrics by Юлия Быкова, singing by Инна Афанасьева)
| Song of the Year
| 
|-
! scope="row" | 2013
| Alyona Lanskaya
| Best Pop Group
| 
|-
! scope="row" | 2013
| beZ bileta
| Best Rock Group
| 
|-
! scope="row" | 2013
| Apple Tea
| Best Jazz Group
| 
|-
! scope="row" | 2013
| Харошкі
| Best Ethno-folk Group
| 
|-
! scope="row" | 2013
| Леонид Ширин and Yuriy Vashchuk (song Беларусь великая)
| Best Songwriter
| 
|-
! scope="row" | 2013
| Павел Бертош (Ты больше не моя, singing by Алексей Хлестов)
| Best Lyricist
| 
|-
! scope="row" | 2013
| Traukamurauka (KRIWI)
| Best Album
| 
|-
! scope="row" | 2013
| Святослав Позняк (song Летняя, singing by Искуи Абалян)
| Best Arranger
| 
|-
! scope="row" | 2013
| Дым над водой (Президентский оркестр Республики Беларусь)
| Concert of the Year
| 
|-
! scope="row" | 2013
| Что в этом сердце (Гюнеш Абасова) and Як жа край наш не любіць (Форс-Минорand Irina Dorofeeva)
| Best Tour
| 
|-
! scope="row" | 2013
| Станция (У нескладоваеand Братья Грим; director Дмитрий Войтенко)
| Music Video of the Year
| 
|-
! scope="row" | 2013
| Tatsyana Mushynskaya (magazine Mastatstva)
| Best Journalist/Music Critic
| 
|-
! scope="row" | 2013
| Следы апостолов from the motion picture Следы апостолов (music by: Максим Алейников, Феликс Луцкий, lyrics by Елена Ярмолович, singing by Валерий Дайнеко)
| Best Song for Film or Television
| 
|-
! scope="row" | 2013
| Eduard Khanok
| For Contribution to the Development of Modern Music
| 
|-
! scope="row" | 2013
| Илья Волков
| Star of the Year (Best Young Performer)
| 
|-
! scope="row" | 2013
| Юлия Фомкина
| Debut of the Year
| 
|-
! scope="row" | 2013
| Тренд делюкс
| Best Choreography
| 
|-
! scope="row" | 2013
| Илья Волков
| Best Young Performer
|

2014 Awards 
On October 30, 2014, the National Music Awards was renamed to The Lira. The selection process began via the website for All-National TV. The site created a list of 65 songs that were eligible for voting. Among the 65 songs in the competition, 10 were in the Belarusian language. On January 31, 2015, at the Palace of the Republic, the annual awards were presented.

|-
! scope="row" | 2014
| Абдымi мяне (Naviband)
| Belarusian-language Song of the Year
| 
|-
! scope="row" | 2014
| Лариса Грибалёва
| Song of the Year
| 
|-
! scope="row" | 2014
| Teo
| Performer of the Year
| 
|-
! scope="row" | 2014
| Misters
| Opening of the Year
| 
|-
! scope="row" | 2014
| production center Спамаш
| Producer of the Year
| 
|-
! scope="row" | 2014
| Профиартвидеон(Yadviga Poplavskaya and Alexander Tikhanovich)
| Best Organizer of Concerts
| 
|-
! scope="row" | 2014
| Леонид Ширин
| Best Songwriter
| 
|-
! scope="row" | 2014
| Елена Ярмолович
| Best Lyricist
| 
|-
! scope="row" | 2014
| IOWA
| For the Popularization of Belarusian Music Abroad
| 
|-
! scope="row" | 2014
| Андрей Саврицкий
| Best Arranger
| 
|-
! scope="row" | 2014
| Yadviga Poplavskaya and Alexander Tikhanovich
| For Contribution to the Development of Popular Music Art
| 
|-
! scope="row" | 2014
| Легенды.Live
| Best Musical Television Project in the Field of Popular Art
| 
|-
! scope="row" | 2014
| You Will Be Here (Жанет)
| Music Video of the Year
| 
|-
! scope="row" | 2014
| Алексей Гросс
| Style of the Year
| 
|-
! scope="row" | 2014
| Беларуськалий
| Patron of the Culture of Belarus in the Field of Popular Music Art
|

2016 Awards 
On October 27, 2016, after a one year break (there were no awards presented in 2015), the Ministry of Culture of the Republic of Belarus announced the start of selection for the Lira Awards. Songs released from January to December 2016 were accepted for consideration. The voting began on the All-National TV channel’s website with 6 nominations: “Best Song in Belarusian,” “Best Performer of the Year (Among Men),” “Best Performer of the Year (Among Women),” “Best Group,” “Best Song of the Year,” and “Best Music Video of the Year.” An expert panel selected the winners in 3 nominations, (“Best Songwriter”, “Best Lyricist”, and “Best Arranger”). The organizers of the competition determined the remaining winners with suggestions from the panel, in the remaining 3 categories, (“Opening of the Year”, “Style of the Year”, and “Ours Abroad”). On February 9, 2017, the awards were presented.

|-
! scope="row" | 2016
| Гісторыя майго жыцця (Naviband)
| Belarusian-language Song of the Year
| 
|-
! scope="row" | 2016
| J:Морс
| Best Group
| 
|-
! scope="row" | 2016
| Блізка (J:Морс)
| Song of the Year
| 
|-
! scope="row" | 2016
| Саша Немо
| Performer of the Year (Male)
| 
|-
! scope="row" | 2016
| Инна Афанасьева
| Performer of the Year (Female)
| 
|-
! scope="row" | 2016
| Елена Атрашкевич
| Best Songwriter
| 
|-
! scope="row" | 2016
| Олег Жуков
| Best Lyricist
| 
|-
! scope="row" | 2016
| Святослав Позняк
| Best Arranger
| 
|-
! scope="row" | 2016
| Адрес — планета Земля (beZ bileta, director Михаил Быченок)
| Music Video of the Year
| 
|-
! scope="row" | 2016
| Dmitry Koldun
| Ours Abroad
| 
|-
! scope="row" | 2016
| Радиоволна
| Opening of the Year
| 
|-
! scope="row" | 2016
| Провокация
| Style of the Year
| 
|-
! scope="row" | 2016
| Amkodor
| Patron of Belarusian Culture
|

Criticism 
At the beginning of 2013, in his column on Charter 97, Źmicier Padbiarezski of Radio Free Europe/Radio Liberty lamented that the organizers of the awards in their nominations “do not notice” quite popular, but partially censored, artists in the country, such as Siarhei Mikhalok, Lavon Volski, or Alexander Kullinkovich. At the request of BelaPAN, he also revealed the vicious practice of the massive use of playbacks at concerts, while the agency's journalists themselves found the evidences of plagiarism in some songs of the performers.

In a number of op-eds over at naviny.by, singer Irina Vidova, winner of the People’s Choice Award in 2011, agreed with criticism of the implementation of the award from a number of journalists, citing her examples of the organizers' negligence too, and emphasized the need for greater transparency in voting, pluralism in the process of nominating contestants and the forming of the composition of the jury, constancy in the rules of the competition, attracting specialists from alternative TV channels and the media to its organization, nevertheless concluding the significance and importance of the project on a national scale as a whole.

In 2013, Źmicier Biezkaravajny, founder of the music portal Experty.by, noted that the award show is “a big project that is shown on television” and “in which people get money [for winning]”. The critic also questioned the quality of the jury composition after an analysis of the 2012 ceremony 
and claimed that, coupled with other shortcomings, all cast doubt on the awards'  national status.

He also confirmed the opinion of an interviewer that economic problems had reached the national stage with the cancellation of the “directive and artificial” ceremony in 2015, “If there is an order, some designated channel conducts it. If there is no order, no one does. This is an indicator of the level of professional relationships within the pop community of Belarus, its spoiledness by state attention. Neither the professional community, as in many countries, nor an initiative group stand behind the award. The Ministry of Culture should not get involved in such projects.”

In a review of all music awards of Belarus for 2013, Pavel Sverdlov, editor of KYKY.ORG, described the second ceremony as an act that “resembled the distribution of the USSR State Prizes” but “with the difference that, no representatives of the alternative music scene slipped in [among the nominees] though.”

In 2014, Alexandr Chernuho, editor of Ultra-music.com, following the coverage of three ceremonies, sharply negatively assessed the implementation of the awarding of music awards, “Year after year we have been watching colossal flaws, mistakes, and profanations: Larisa Gribaleva, who sits in the jury, receives the award for the best song of the year, Irina Dorofeeva is confused with Iskui Abalyan, Valeriy Dayneko’s playback cuts short, and it turns out that he does not know the lyrics of the song.”

Footnotes

References

External links
 
 У Беларусі аб’яўленыя пераможцы Нацыянальнай музычнай прэміі // 13 сьнежня 2012 г.
 Нацыянальная музычная прэмія ў галіне папулярнай музыкі Ліра» // 10 лютага 2017 г.
 

2011 establishments in Belarus
European music awards
Belarusian music
Awards established in 2011